Minuscule 318 (in the Gregory-Aland numbering), Θε409 (Soden), is a Greek minuscule manuscript of the New Testament, on parchment. Palaeographically it has been assigned to the 14th century.

Description 

The codex contains the text of the John 7:9-12:8 on 16 parchment leaves. The text is written in two columns per page, in 58-63 lines per page. Text is in red ink. The biblical text is surrounded by a commentary by Theophylact. 

It does not include the Pericope Adulterae (John 7:53-8:11).

Kurt Aland did not place the Greek text of the codex in any Category.

History 

The manuscript was added to the list of New Testament manuscripts by Scholz (1794–1852). 
It was examined and described by Paulin Martin. C. R. Gregory saw the manuscript in 1885.

The manuscript is currently housed at the Bibliothèque nationale de France (Gr. 213) at Paris.

See also 

 List of New Testament minuscules
 Biblical manuscript
 Textual criticism

References

Further reading 

 

Greek New Testament minuscules
14th-century biblical manuscripts
Bibliothèque nationale de France collections